Jerusalem and Figtree Hill is a settlement on the island of Saint Croix in the United States Virgin Islands. It has a population of 56 in 35 housing units, spread over 1.05 square miles, according to the 2010 United States Census.

References

Populated places in Saint Croix, U.S. Virgin Islands